Lihula Parish was a rural municipality in Lääne County, Estonia. In 2017, Lihula Parish, Hanila Parish, Koonga Parish, and Varbla Parish were merged to form Lääneranna Parish.

Settlements

Town
Lihula

Villages

References

External links
 

Former municipalities of Estonia